Hybobathus is a genus of hoverfly in the Neotropical region, formerly included in the genus Ocyptamus, which was split after researchers determined it was not monophyletic.

Species
H. anera (Curran, 1939)
H. arx (Fluke, 1936)
H. bivittatus (Curran, 1941)
H. cobboldia (Hull, 1958)
H. cubensis (Macquart, 1850)
H. druida (Hull, 1947)
H. flavipennis (Wiedemann, 1830)
H. idanus (Curran, 1941)
H. lineatus (Macquart, 1846)
H. lividus (Schiner, 1868)
H. macropyga (Curran, 1941)
H. myrtella (Hull, 1960)
H. nectarinus (Hull, 1942)
H. norina (Curran, 1941)
H. notatus (Loew, 1866)
H. obsoletus (Curran, 1941)
H. pennatus (Hull, 1943)
H. persimilis (Curran, 1930)
H. phaeopterus (Schiner, 1868)
H. placivus (Williston, 1888)
H. quadrilineatus Enderlein, 1938
H. rubricosus (Wiedemann, 1830)
H. ryl (Hull, 1943)
H. silaceus (Austen, 1893)
H. thecla (Hull, 1943)
H. vittiger (Hull, 1949)
H. wiedemanni Enderlein, 1938
H. zenia (Curran, 1941)

References

Diptera of South America
Hoverfly genera
Syrphini